Northpoint or Northpointe may refer to:

 North, a cardinal direction
 Northpoint, Pennsylvania, a community
 Northpoint City, a Singapore shopping mall
 NorthPoint Communications, now a part of AT&T
 Northpoint Technology
 Northpoint Training Center, a prison in Kentucky
 The original name of North Point (Cambridge, Massachusetts)
 NorthPointe Christian Schools, a school in Grand Rapids, Michigan

See also
 North Point (disambiguation)